Pots and Shots is the debut album of J-ska band Potshot. The album was released in the United States by Asian Man Records in 1997.

Tracks
 We Are Potshot    1:06
 Someone to Lean On    2:26
 Radio    1:49
 Handle    2:35
 Time    2:49
 Since Yesterday   1:46
 Anytime    2:33
 Clear    2:35
 Under the Blue Sky    3:00
 Tears of a Clown    1:06
 In Hi-Fi     2:27
 Not Worth Your While But Worth My Life    2:49
 Mexico     3:15
 Change     3:40

1997 debut albums
Potshot (band) albums
Asian Man Records albums